The Grigorovich I-Z was a fighter aircraft developed in the Soviet Union during the 1930s. Advances in aircraft survivability thanks to all-metal construction and self-sealing and inert gas-filled fuel tanks led to experimentation with large-caliber weapons to shoot them down. In Soviet Union, Leonid Kurchevsky developed a series of recoilless rifles in various calibers and in 1930 was decided to adapt the 76.2 mm (3 in) weapons for aircraft use.

The result was a conventional strut-braced monoplane with fixed landing gear. A pair of Kurchevsky APK (APK - Aviatsionnaya Pushka Kurchevsky - aircraft cannon Kurchevsky) rifles were mounted under the wings outside the propeller arc and the rear fuselage and tail assembly were of reinforced metal construction to withstand the blast. A single small-caliber synchronized machine gun in the left fuselage was added to aid the pilot in aiming.

Two prototypes were built, the first flying in mid-1931. The second strengthened I-Zbis flew at the beginning of the following year. These were followed by 21 examples ordered as evaluation aircraft and 50 production machines. By the time this last batch was being delivered, however, it was already apparent that the concept of a "single-shot" fighter was flawed and the I-Zs that had been built were relegated to various testing roles. One such role was as a parasite fighter in the Zveno project.

Operators

Soviet Air Force

Specifications (I-Z)

See also

References

Bibliography

Further reading
 
 

1930s Soviet fighter aircraft
Grigorovich aircraft
Conventional landing gear